Bilateral relations exist between the Commonwealth of Australia and the state of Qatar.

In 2012, Qatar opened an embassy in Canberra, Australia and an Ambassador to Qatar and the UAE was appointed, the first time an Ambassador to Qatar has been appointed. There are 3,000 Australians in Qatar. In 2016, Australia opened an embassy in Doha, Qatar.

Investment
Up to 2017, Hassad Food, which is an investment arm of the Qatar Investment Authority, had invested more than $500 million to buy prime agricultural land in Australia, to own 3,000 square kilometres, with five properties in New South Wales, one in Victoria, one in Queensland, three in South Australia and three in Western Australia.  The company is proposing to invest another $500 million in Australia.  Senator Bernardi has said, "We can have a debate and a discussion about the wisdom of foreign ownership of some of our strategic assets, but I do not know how anyone can justify a government that is recognised by its peers and our allies as the funder of terrorism owning such resources in our own country".

2020 airport incident
On 2 October 2020, thirteen Australian female passengers aboard a Qatar Airways flight to Sydney from Hamad International Airport in Doha were forced to deplane before takeoff, and were subsequently strip searched and "subjected to an invasive internal examination" against their will. This was alleged prompted by the discovery of a newborn baby in an airport bathroom. This evolved into a diplomatic incident between Australia and Qatar with Australian foreign minister Marise Payne stating "the treatment of the women concerned was offensive, grossly inappropriate, and beyond circumstances in which the women could give free and informed consent".

Following adverse media coverage, on 28 October the Qatari government issued a statement of regret and promised a "comprehensive, transparent investigation".

FIFA 2022
Australia and other countries have criticised Qatar for the way it treats women, homosexuals and foreigners.

Transport links
As of July 2019 Qatar Airways, the flag carrier airline of Qatar has services to and from Hamad International Airport in Doha to five Australian cities.

See also 
 2017 Qatar diplomatic crisis
 Foreign relations of Australia
 Foreign relations of Qatar

References 

 
Bilateral relations of Qatar
Qatar